The Grand Rapids Open was a golf tournament played at Cascade Hills Country Club, Grand Rapids, Michigan from 18 to 21 August 1949. The event was won by Jim Ferrier whose score of 25-under-par set a new record for a PGA tournament.

Winners

References

Former PGA Tour events
Golf in Michigan